Big Bend is a town in eastern Eswatini, lying on the Great Usutu River (Lusutfu).  Its main industry is farming and it is based mostly on sugar plantations. Big Bend is also surrounded by nature/game reserves such as Mhlosinga Nature Reserve and Nisela Safaris.

Schools 
Big Bend has several schools, such as The Edu-care Centre which is a preschool which caters to Swazi and expatriate children along with its sister schools, Ubombo Primary School and Sisekelo High School. They were established in the late 1970s and have pioneered the high level of teaching excellence in the kingdom that paved the way for other schools to follow.

Climate
Big Bend has a hot semi-arid climate (Köppen: BSh) with very hot and moderately rainy summers and warm, dry winters. The lowest temperature to have ever been recorded in Eswatini, was recorded at Big Bend.

References

External links
 The Edu-care Centre Big Bend Swaziland
 https://sisekelo.ac.sz/
 https://www.illovosugarafrica.com/About-us/Eswatini
 

Populated places in Lubombo Region
Maputo River